Henry County is a county located in the western portion of the U.S. state of Missouri. As of the 2010 census, the population was 22,272. Its county seat is Clinton. The county was organized December 13, 1834 as Rives County but was renamed in 1841 for Revolutionary War patriot Patrick Henry. The county originally had been named after William Cabell Rives, who was then serving as a U.S. Senator from Virginia. However, Rives lost popularity in Missouri after he joined the Whig Party.

Geography

Adjacent counties
Johnson County (north)
Pettis County (northeast)
Benton County (east)
St. Clair County (south)
Bates County (west)
Cass County (northwest)

Major highways
 Route 7
 Route 13
 Route 18
 Route 52

Demographics

As of the census of 2000, there were 21,997 people, 9,133 households, and 6,246 families residing in the county.  The population density was 31 people per square mile (12/km2).  There were 10,261 housing units at an average density of 15 per square mile (6/km2).  The racial makeup of the county was 96.61% White, 1.02% Black or African American, 0.70% Native American, 0.25% Asian, 0.02% Pacific Islander, 0.34% from other races, and 1.05% from two or more races. Approximately 0.91% of the population were Hispanic or Latino of any race.

There were 9,133 households, out of which 28.40% had children under the age of 18 living with them, 55.30% were married couples living together, 9.30% had a female householder with no husband present, and 31.60% were non-families. 27.70% of all households were made up of individuals, and 13.30% had someone living alone who was 65 years of age or older.  The average household size was 2.37 and the average family size was 2.86.

In the county, the population was spread out, with 23.70% under the age of 18, 7.80% from 18 to 24, 25.80% from 25 to 44, 24.40% from 45 to 64, and 18.30% who were 65 years of age or older.  The median age was 40 years. For every 100 females there were 95.50 males.  For every 100 females age 18 and over, there were 91.30 males.

The median income for a household in the county was $30,949, and the median income for a family was $36,328. Males had a median income of $27,932 versus $19,201 for females. The per capita income for the county was $16,468.  About 11.40% of families and 14.30% of the population were below the poverty line, including 19.40% of those under age 18 and 13.90% of those age 65 or over.

2020 Census

Education

Public schools
Calhoun R-VIII School District– Calhoun
Calhoun Elementary School (K-06)
Calhoun High School (07-12)
Clinton School District – Clinton
Henry Elementary School (K-02)
Clinton Intermediate School (03-05)
Clinton Middle School (06-08)
Clinton High School (09-12)
Davis R-XII School District – Clinton
Davis Elementary School (K-08)
Henry County R-I School District – Windsor
Windsor Elementary School (PK-06)
Windsor High School (07-12)
Lakeland R-III School District – Deepwater/Lowry City
Actually located in St. Clair County
Lakeland Elementary School (PK-06)
Lakeland High School (07-12)
Leesville R-IX School District – Clinton
Leesville Elementary School (K-08)
Montrose R-XIV School District – Montrose
Montrose Elementary School (K-08)
Montrose High School (09-12)
Shawnee R-III School District – Chilhowee 
Shawnee Elementary School (K-08)

Private schools
Windsor Amish Schools – Windsor (01-08) – Amish
St. Mary's School – Montrose (01-08) – Roman Catholic
Holy Rosary Catholic School – Clinton (PK-08) – Roman Catholic
Clinton Christian Academy – Clinton (K4-12) – Nondenominational Christian

Public libraries
Henry County Library  
Lenora Blackmore Branch of Henry County Library

Politics

Local
The Democratic Party historically controls politics at the local level in Henry County. However, recent gains by Republicans have made Henry County a swing county.

State

All of Henry County is a part of Missouri's 57th District in the Missouri House of Representatives and is represented by 
Rodger Reedy (R-Windsor), who was elected in 2018.

All of Henry County is a part of Missouri's 31st District in the Missouri Senate and is currently represented by Ed Emery (R-Lamar).

Federal

All of Henry County is included in Missouri's 4th Congressional District and is currently represented by Vicky Hartzler (R-Harrisonville) in the U.S. House of Representatives.

Political culture

Communities

Cities

Blairstown
Brownington
Calhoun
Clinton (county seat)
Deepwater
Montrose
Urich
Windsor

Villages
La Due
Tightwad

Census-designated place
Hartwell

Unincorporated communities

 Bowen
 Coal
 Finey
 Garland
 Germantown
 Huntingdale
 Leesville
 Lewis
 Lucas
 Maurine
 Mount Zion
 Petersburg
 Piper
 Quarles
 Roseland
 Shawnee Mound

See also
National Register of Historic Places listings in Henry County, Missouri

References

Further reading
 Lamkin, Uel. A History of Henry County, Missouri (1919) full text

External links
 Digitized 1930 Plat Book of Henry County  from University of Missouri Division of Special Collections, Archives, and Rare Books

 
1834 establishments in Missouri
Populated places established in 1834
Missouri counties